Sowon may refer to:

So-won, South Korean feminine given name

History
Seowon (also romanised Sŏwŏn), educational institutions in Korea during the Joseon Dynasty
Sowon, the fourth rank of concubines of the king in styles and titles in the Joseon Dynasty

Entertainment
Hope (2013 film), South Korean film

Geography
Sowon-ri, village (ri) in Sinchon County, South Hwanghae Province, North Korea
Sowon-myeon, township (myeon) in Taean County, South Chungcheong Province, South Korea

See also
Swoon (disambiguation)